Boninella is a genus of beetles in the family Cerambycidae, containing the following species:

 Boninella anolops (N. Ohbayashi, 1976)
 Boninella degenerata Gressitt, 1956
 Boninella hirsuta (N. Ohbayashi, 1976)
 Boninella igai N. Ohbayashi, 1976
 Boninella satoi (N. Ohbayashi, 1976)

References

Acanthocinini